This is a compilation of symbols commonly used in astronomy, particularly professional astronomy.

Age (stellar)
 τ - age

Astrometry parameters
Astrometry parameters
 Rv - radial velocity
 cz - apparent radial velocity
 z - Redshift
 μ - proper motion
 π - parallax
 J - epoch
 α - Right Ascension
 δ - Declination
 λ - Ecliptic longitude
 β - Ecliptic latitude
 l - Galactic longitude
 b - Galactic latitude

Cosmological parameters
Cosmological parameters
 h - dimensionless Hubble parameter
 H0 - Hubble constant
 Λ - cosmological constant
 Ω - density parameter
 ρ - density
 ρc - critical density
 z - redshift

Distance description
Distance description for orbital and non-orbital parameters:
 d - distance
 d - in km = kilometer
 d - inhttps://academia.stackexchange.com/a/29113 mi = mile
 d - in AU = astronomical unit
 d - in ly = light-year
 d - in pc = parsec
 d - in kpc = kiloparsec (1000 pc)
 DL - luminosity distance, obtaining an objects distance using only visual aspects

Galaxy comparison
Galaxy type and spectral comparison:
 see galaxy morphological classification

Luminosity comparison
Luminosity comparison:
 LS,  - luminosity of the Sun (Sol)

Luminosity of certain object:
 Lacc - accretion luminosity
 Lbol - bolometric luminosity

Mass comparison
Mass comparison:
 ME,  - mass of Earth
 ,  - mass of Jupiter
 MS,  - mass of the Sun (Sol)

Mass of certain object:
 M● - mass of black hole
 Macc - mass of accretion disc

Metallicity comparison
Metallicity comparison:
 [Fe/H] - Ratio of Iron to Hydrogen. This is not an exact ratio, but rather a logarithmic representation of the ratio of a star's iron abundance compared to that of the Sun.
 for a given star : , where the values represent the number densities of the given element. 
 [M/H] - Metallicity ratio.
 Z - Metallicity
 Z☉, ZS - Metallicity of the Sun (Sol)

Orbital parameters
Orbital Parameters of a Cosmic Object:
 α - RA, right ascension, if the Greek letter does not appear, á letter will appear.
 δ - Dec, declination, if the Greek letter does not appear, ä letter will appear.
 P or Porb or T - orbital period
 a - semi-major axis
 b - semi-minor axis
 q - periapsis, the minimum distance
 Q - apoapsis, the maximum distance
 e - eccentricity
 i - inclination
 Ω - longitude of ascending node
 ω - argument of periapsis
 RL - Roche lobe
 M - Mean anomaly
 Mo - Mean anomaly at epoch

Radius comparison
Radius comparison:
 RE,  - Radius compared to Earth
 ,  - Radius compared to Jupiter
 RS,  - Radius compared to The Sun (Sol)

Spectral comparison
Spectral comparison:
 see Stellar classification
 m(object) - Apparent magnitude
 M(object) - Absolute magnitude, for galaxies and stars
 H(object) - Absolute magnitude, for planets and nonstellar objects

Temperature description
Temperature description:
 Teff - Temperature Effect, usually associated with luminous object
 Tmax - Temperature Maximum, usually associated with non-luminous object
 Tavg - Temperature Average, usually associated with non-luminous object
 Tmin - Temperature Minimum, usually associated with non-luminous object
 K - Kelvin

See also
 List of astronomy acronyms
 Astronomical symbols
 Stellar classification
 Galaxy morphological classification
 List of astronomical catalogues
 Glossary of astronomy

References

Symbols
Astronomy